Niklas Storbacka (born 20 February 1977) is a Finnish footballer, who currently represents FF Jaro of Veikkausliiga, the Finnish premier division of football.

See also
Football in Finland
List of football clubs in Finland

References

External links
Guardian's Stats Centre

1977 births
Living people
Finnish footballers
Association football midfielders
Association football defenders